Lost Nation, Illinois is an unincorporated census-designated place in Ogle County, Illinois, United States, located south of the city of Oregon. As of the 2010 census, its population was 708.

Attractions
Lost Nation has a popular golf course, called "Lost Nation Golf Course" that has 18 holes, watered fairways, and a pro shop as well as a cocktail lounge.

References

Census-designated places in Illinois
Census-designated places in Ogle County, Illinois